The Rover 200 Series, and later the Rover 25, are a series of small family cars that were produced by British manufacturer Rover from 1984 until 2005.

There have been three distinct generations of the Rover 200. The first generation was a four-door saloon car based on the Honda Ballade. The second generation was available in three or five-door hatchback forms, as well a coupé and cabriolet (in relatively small numbers). Its sister model, the Honda Concerto was built on the same production line in Rover's Longbridge factory. The final generation was developed independently by Rover on the platform of its predecessor, and was available as a three or five-door hatchback. Just before BMW's sale of Rover in 2000, and following a facelift, the model was renamed and sold as the Rover 25, and the MG ZR was based on the Rover 25 with mechanical changes to the suspension. Production ceased in 2005 when MG Rover went into administration. Production rights and tooling for the model, but not the Rover name, now belong to Chinese car manufacturer Nanjing.

Rover 200 (SD3; 1984–1989)

The original Rover 200 (sometimes referred to by the codename SD3) was the replacement for the earlier Triumph Acclaim, and was the second product of the alliance between British Leyland (BL) and Honda. Only available as a four-door saloon, the 200 series was intended to be more upmarket than the company's Maestro and Montego models, which the 200 Series came in between in terms of size. It was launched on 19 June 1984, at which time there was still a high demand for small family saloons, with many manufacturers selling this type of car under a different nameplate to similar-sized hatchbacks. For example, Ford was selling the saloon version of the Escort as the Orion, the saloon version of the Volkswagen Golf was called the Jetta, and Vauxhall would soon launch an Astra-based saloon called the Belmont. The Rover 200 Series, however, was not based on a hatchback.

Earlier in 1984, Austin Rover had confirmed that the successor to the Acclaim would be badged as a Rover rather than a Triumph - a decision which signalled the end for the Triumph brand.  The move was seen as controversial as the Rover brand had long been associated with large executive saloons as well as the Land Rover and Range Rover, and there were fears that its application to a small Japanese-derived compact would devalue the Rover name.

Essentially, the 200 series was a British-built Honda Ballade, the original design of which had been collaborated upon by both companies. Engines employed were either the Honda Civic derived E series 'EV2'  1.3-litre 12-valve engine, or British Leyland's own S-series engine in 1.6-litre format (both in  carburettor and  Lucas EFi form). The resulting cars were badged as either Rover 213 or Rover 216.

The 213 used either a Honda five-speed manual gearbox or a Honda three-speed automatic transmission. The British-engined 216 also employed a Honda five-speed manual gearbox, unlike the S-Series engine when fitted in the Maestro and Montego. There was also the option of a German ZF four-speed automatic on some 216 models as well.

The Honda-badged version was the first Honda car to be built in the United Kingdom (the Honda equivalent of the 200 Series' predecessor, the Triumph Acclaim, was never sold in the UK). Ballade bodyshells, and later complete cars, were made in the Longbridge plant alongside the Rover equivalent, with the Ballade models then going to Honda's new Swindon plant for quality-control checks.

Although production ceased in late 1989, stocks of the car continued to be available until early 1990, when it was replaced by the Rover 400.

This model of car (SD3 saloon version; 216S in the first series, then replaced by a 216SE EFi model) is well known as Richard and Hyacinth Bucket's car in the BBC Television sitcom Keeping Up Appearances (1990–1995).

Rover 200 (R8; 1989–1995)

The R8 Rover 200, sometimes referred to as the Mk 2 Rover 200, was launched on 11 October 1989. Unlike the Mk 1, Ballade-based, 200, this model was a five-door hatchback designed to replace the Maestro while the saloon variant, called the 400 Series, was effectively the replacement for the previous Rover 200 Series when it was launched in April 1990. The 400 had a different nomenclature to the 200 because at the time many saloon versions of compact cars were positioned slightly upmarket from their hatchback siblings, often featuring higher specification and prices, in addition to different names - a notable example being the Ford Orion, the saloon version of the Ford Escort. 

The Maestro continued alongside the Rover 200 hatchback as a budget option until production finished in December 1994.

The 200 also spawned three-door hatchback, coupé and convertible versions, while the 400 eventually spawned an estate version. These latter variants were solely Rover designed and produced products, with no Honda Concerto versions available. Initial plans to sell the coupe version under the MG marque were abandoned, although the 5-door hatchback was the most popular and common version. 

The R8 200 was the first car to be introduced by the newly privatised Rover Group. Once again, the model was designed in collaboration with Honda (who produced the new designed-for-Europe Concerto model) and both models would share production lines at Rover's Longbridge facility. The 200 and Concerto itself were based on the 4th generation Civic (EC), of which the 3-door hatchback, coupé CRX and saloon versions were sold in the United Kingdom (meaning that Honda had effectively two different saloon models of the same car in the same class).

The 200 also saw the introduction of Rover's brand-new K-series family of engines (appearing in 1.4 L (1396 cc) twin-cam 16-valve form). The 1.6 L (1590 cc) version used either a Honda D16A6 SOHC or D16A8 DOHC powerplant, while the 2.0 L M-series unit from the 800-series followed soon afterwards (1991) in the sportier versions. The Rover-engined models drove the front wheels via jointly developed Peugeot/Rover R65 gearboxes (1.4-litre) and Rover PG-1 gearboxes for the 1.6- and 2.0-litre versions. From December 1990, the carburettor-engine 214S (with a 1.4 engine from the Metro) was added to the range, but discontinued within two years due to EEC emissions requirements. Its gap was filled by the 214i, which featured the 1.4 K-series unit from the 214Si and 214SLi.

Also available were two PSA (non-electronically controlled Lucas CAV injection pumps) Indirect injection diesel engines, with the choice of naturally aspirated 1.9-litre XUD9 or turbocharged 1.8 XUD7T engines. They were class leading in their refinement in Peugeot and Citroen installations, but less refined in the Rovers. These engines were installed instead of the non-electronically controlled Bosch HPVE Direct Injection Rover MDi / Perkins Prima used in the Austin Maestro and Montego, because that engine with its noisy combustion but lower fuel consumption, was deemed too unrefined for the new models.

In France, Italy, and Portugal, where demand for diesel cars was high, Honda offered a rebadged 200 Turbodiesel called the Concerto TD. Despite the Concerto name, this model retained the 200's exterior lighting, suspension, and trim.

The Rover 200 was produced alongside the Maestro, which continued to sell in smaller figures alongside it for the next five years. Because the R8 diesel used Lucas fuel injection rather than Bosch, it is less suitable for vegetable oil fuel, even though the XUD itself is one of the best engines for it.

On its launch, the R8 200 was one of the few new designs in the small family car class. For instance, Ford's Escort had been around since 1980, (with a facelift in early 1986) and Vauxhall's Astra was unchanged from its 1984 launch. Indeed, the only major European competitors that had been around for less than five years were the Peugeot 309, Renault 19 and Fiat Tipo. However, the Escort, Astra and Golf had all been replaced by the start of 1992.

On average, up to 110,000 Rover 200 and 400 (R8) models were sold each year, more than half being sold in Britain. The 214 won What Car?s 1990 "Car of the Year", but was not considered for the 1990 European Car of the Year award as it was not yet available on the required number of European markets for it to be shortlisted.

In the autumn of 1993, the 200 received a mild facelift, featuring redesigned front indicator lights, but unlike its 400 sibling, which was also facelifted at the same time, the car did not feature a new grille (which Rover reintroduced on the 1992 R17 facelift of the Rover 800) or new body coloured bumpers. This led to some owners retro-fitting the 400's new grille on to the 200. In 1993 Rover finally added the new grille and body coloured bumpers to the 200 range.

The addition of more powerful versions of the Rover 200 Series, including the GTi models, saw the demise of the high performance MG Maestro 2.0 EFi and Turbo models in 1991. A coupe version was launched in late 1992, and among the engine options were the 220 Turbo which was the fastest Rover to be produced at the time, with a top speed of more than 150mph. Rover had originally considered marketing the coupe version of the car as an MG, but eventually decided to include it as part of the Rover 200 range.

Rover 200 (R3; 1995–1999)

The Rover 200, codenamed R3, was smaller than the Honda-based R8 cars. This was due to Rover's need to replace the ageing Metro, which by now was 15 years old. Although some elements of the previous 200 / 400 were carried over (most notably the front structure, heater, steering and front suspension), it was by-and-large an all-new car that had been developed by Rover. Honda did provide early body design support as a result of moving production of the Honda Concerto from Longbridge to Swindon, freeing up capacity for 60,000 units at Rover. At this point, the car had a cut-down version of the previous car's rear floor and suspension and was codenamed SK3.

Lack of boot space and other factors led to Rover reengineering the rear end to take a modified form of the Maestro rear suspension and the product was renamed R3. By the time the car was launched, Honda and Rover had already been "divorced" after the BMW takeover the previous year. The new 200 used K-series petrol engines, most notably the 1.8 L VVC version from the MGF, and L-series diesel engine. During the mid-1990s the L-series was a very competitive engine, regarded as second only to the Volkswagen TDI in overall performance, and an improvement over the R8's XUD - particularly in fuel economy, while almost matching it for refinement.

Launched with 1.4i 16v and 1.6i 16v petrol engines and 2.0 turbodiesel ( and intercooled  versions) engines, the range grew later to include a 1.1i and 1.4i 8v engines and also 1.8 16v units in standard and variable valve formats. R65 Peugeot/Rover Manual gearboxes carried over from the R8 Rover 200 were available across the range and a CVT option was available on the 1.6i 16v unit.

The R3 featured a completely redesigned interior and dashboard to accommodate the fitment of a passenger airbag in line with new safety standards.

The 1.8-litre models earned a certain amount of praise for their performance, whilst the intercooled turbo diesel was claimed as one of the fastest-accelerating diesel hatchbacks on the market in the late 1990s.

Unlike its predecessor, the R3 was not available in Coupe, Cabriolet or Tourer bodystyles, although Rover updated these versions of the older model with mild styling revisions and the fitting of the new dashboard from the R3, which was possible due to the shared front bulkhead. In the UK, these models were no longer branded as 200/400 models, simply being referred to as the Rover Coupe, Cabriolet and Tourer.

The Rover 200 might have been marketed as a supermini, it compares closely in size and engine range with contemporary models such as the Ford Fiesta and Vauxhall Corsa. Instead Rover priced the car to compete with vehicles like the Ford Escort and Vauxhall Astra. Rover's only offering in the supermini segment at the time was the ageing Metro and this gap in the company's line-up needed to be filled.

The third generation 200 was initially popular, being Britain's seventh-best-selling new car in 1996 through to 1998. Within three years it had fallen out of the top 10 completely and was being outsold by traditionally poorer selling cars like the Fiat Bravo/Brava and Renault Mégane.

Rover 200 BRM

The Rover 200 BRM was first shown at the 1997 Frankfurt Motor Show, the reaction from the press and public was good enough that after a year of development the Rover 200 BRM LE was officially launched at the British Motor Show in October 1998. It was based on the range-topping Vi model but with 1960's BRM styling cues. The engine was the  1.8-litre VVC K-Series.

Inside, there were red quilted leather seats and door panels, red carpet, seat belts and steering wheel. Alloy heater controls and turned aluminium trim complimented this. On the outside, there was Brooklands Green paintwork, with silver trim details, 16-inch alloy wheels, and an exclusive woven mesh grille sat above a large orange snout in the front bumper, which was the BRM trademark nose on all of its 1960s Formula One racing cars.

Technical adjustments consisted of  lower ride height over the Vi and improved damping and handling, a close-ratio gearbox with a TorSen differential further developed from the Rover 220 Turbo, reduced torque steer and improved straight-line stability.

The price was £18,000, excluding extras such as air conditioning, passenger airbag and a CD player. There were only 795 built for the UK, with an additional 350 for overseas markets. The steep price was originally slashed to £16,000 and when the Rover 25 was launched, this was cut to £14,000 to get rid of vehicles still lingering in showrooms.

Safety
The NCWR organisation (New Car Whiplash Ratings) tested the Rover 200 and awarded it the following scores:G = GoodA = AcceptableM = MarginalP = Poor

Reviews
The Rover 200 received moderate to good reviews from the motoring press.
 Parker's Car Guides 'Pros: Cheap to buy; good to drive.' | 'Cons: Reliability hasn't been good.'
 RAC 'It may not be 'Above All' but it's certainly a Rover. These days that means class, which, in this case, needn't cost a lot.'

Rover 25 (1999–2005)

A facelifted version of the Rover 200, renamed the Rover 25 (internal codename Jewel) was launched in autumn 1999 for the 2000 model year. It was repositioned and priced to compete with the Ford Fiesta and Vauxhall Corsa, rather than larger cars like the Ford Focus and Vauxhall Astra. This version used similar frontal styling to the larger 75 model. The chassis had been uprated to give sportier handling (suspension and steering setup from 200vi) and the front end had been restyled to give it the corporate Rover look first seen in the range-topping 75, a number of safety improvements and interior changes were made, but the 25 was instantly recognisable as a reworked 200 Series. The 1.4 L, 1.6 L, and 1.8 L petrol engines as well as the 2.0 L diesel were all carried over from the previous range. CVT automatic gearboxes were carried over from the R3 200, with 'Steptronic' (later 'Stepspeed' post-BMW demerger) semi-automatic system available from late 2000. R65 manual gearboxes were again carried over but were later superseded by Ford 'IB5' units in mid-2003. The 1.8-liter engined cars and all diesels used Rover's PG1 5-speed manual gearbox throughout the car's life.

The Rover 25 also saw the introduction, from autumn 2000, of the 16V twin-cam version of the 1.1 L K-Series engine, replacing the 1.1 single-cam 8-valve K-Series engine previously found in the Rover 211i.

Less than a year after the Rover 25 was launched, BMW sold the Rover Group to the Phoenix consortium for a token £10. By the summer of 2001, the newly named MG Rover Group had introduced a sporty version of the Rover 25: the MG ZR. It had modified interior and exterior styling, as well as sports suspension, to give the car the look of a "hot" hatchback. It was frequently Britain's best-selling "hot hatch". At this time the Rover 25 GTi was discontinued.

Initially available in i, iE, iS, iL and GTi trim levels, a range topping iXL model was introduced in 2002 adding full leather upholstery, passenger airbag and 15-inch 'Coronet' alloy wheels to the iL specification. Initially available with the 1.6-liter K series engine, a 1.4-liter version of the iXL followed.  

In 2003, Rover made a version of the car with increased ride height and chunkier bumpers, called Streetwise. The car was marketed by Rover as an "urban on-roader". They also introduced a van version of the 25 called the Rover Commerce.

In 2004, MG Rover gave the cars an exterior restyle to make them look more modern. The majority of changes however were focused on the interior, which featured a completely new layout and fascia design. Trim levels were revised to i, Si, SEi and SXi, with high-spec leather-trimmed GLi, GSi and GXi models introduced for the 2005 model year.

Production of both cars was suspended in April 2005 when the company went into administration. In March 2005, the 25 won the "Bargain of the Year Award" at the prestigious Auto Express Used Car Honours: "The compact hatchback was recognised by the judges for the availability and affordability that help make five-year old examples an attractive purchase proposition."

Specifications for the Rover 25 design were purchased by Shanghai Automotive Industry Corporation in early 2005, though new MG Rover Group owner, Nanjing Automobile Group now owns the tooling for the car. In 2008, the Streetwise, rebadged as the MG 3SW, was relaunched in China.

The Rover 25 was Britain's best selling new car in April 2000, due to a brief surge in sales among buyers wanting to support the company at the time of their sell–off by BMW. However, sales quickly settled back down to normal levels, and although the asking price was now in line with other superminis, the 25 was never able to seriously compete with the Ford Fiesta and Vauxhall Corsa in terms of popularity. It was even outsold by the likes of the Peugeot 206, Fiat Punto, Volkswagen Polo, Seat Ibiza, Skoda Fabia and Renault Clio.

Safety
The 25 underwent the Euro NCAP car safety tests in 2001 and achieved the following ratings:

The NCWR organisation (New Car Whiplash Ratings) tested the facelifted Rover 25 and awarded it the following scores:

G = Good
A = Acceptable
M = Marginal
P = Poor

Security
The Rover 25 was tested by Thatcham's New Vehicle Security Ratings (NVSR) organisation and achieved the following ratings:

Reviews
The Rover 25' received mixed to good reviews from the motoring press.
 The AA 'The original 200 ... was never going to sell against the Golfs and Astras of the time, even though that was the sales pitch and price. The 25 remedied this. We're left with a hatchback that's now the right size and price to compete; if only it were better equipped and these lower-range versions offered a bit more comfort when they're on the move.'
 Parker's Car Guides 'Pros: Sporty driving experience, good quality.''Cons: Cramped interior.'
 RAC 'The Rover 25 series has developed into a very fine range of cars [and] additional chassis work had taken place ... to bring the standard models up to the old 200vi's handling standards. Rover's repositioning of the car had propelled a middle-order family hatch to somewhere near the top of the supermini class.'
 What Car? Reader Reviews 'For – The 25 is cheap, quiet and has a roomy boot. Fuel consumption is good on petrols, too.''Against – The interior is plain, build quality is iffy, the turbodiesel is unrefined, and safety standards are poor.'

Powertrains
These were the engines available for the Rover 200 (1995–1999) and Rover 25 (2000–2005). Each engine was modified at regular intervals throughout its life with economy and emissions improving with the changes.

References

External links
 Rover 200 & 400 Owners Club
 Rover 200/25 development story

200
Hatchbacks
Front-wheel-drive vehicles
Cars introduced in 1984
1990s cars
2000s cars
Touring cars
Sedans
Euro NCAP superminis
Cars discontinued in 2011